Natomas Unified School District is located in northwestern Sacramento, California.  It is the main school district of Natomas, a neighborhood of Sacramento. Chris Evans is the Superintendent. William Young is the Deputy Superintendent of Administrative Services. Heather Garcia is the Associate Superintendent of School Leadership and Support. Doug Orr is the Associate Superintendent of Human Resources and Facilities.

NUSD ranks first out of seventeen in diversity in Sacramento county.

Schools

High schools
 Discovery High School
 Inderkum High School
 Natomas High School

Middle schools
 Heron School
 Natomas Middle School
 Natomas Gateways Middle School

K-8 schools
 Heron School
 Paso Verde School

Elementary/K-8 schools
 American Lakes School
 Bannon Creek School
 H. Allen Hight Elementary School
 Jefferson School
 Natomas Park Elementary School
 Two Rivers Elementary School
 Witter Ranch Elementary School

Charter schools
Natomas Charter School (five charter programs: Star Academy, Leading Edge (LE), Performing & Fine Arts Academy (PFAA), Virtual Learning Academy (VLA) and Pursuing Academic Choices Together (PACT), a homeschool program. It is a TK-12 school. The school has about 1,600 students.
 Natomas Pacific Pathways Preparatory (a.k.a. NP3)
 Westlake Charter School
 Leroy Greene Academy

References

External links
 

School districts in Sacramento County, California